The 2019–20 Rutgers Scarlet Knights women's basketball team represented Rutgers University during the 2019–20 NCAA Division I women's basketball season. The Scarlet Knights, led by 25th year head coach C. Vivian Stringer, played their home games at the Louis Brown Athletic Center, better known as The RAC, as a member of the Big Ten Conference.

They finished the season 22–8, 11–7 in Big Ten play to finish in fifth place. They advanced to the quarterfinals of the Big Ten women's tournament where they lost to Indiana. They did not get a chance for further post season play, as the NCAA women's basketball tournament and WNIT were cancelled before they began due to the COVID-19 pandemic.

Roster

Schedule

|-
!colspan=9 style=| Non-Conference Regular season

|-
!colspan=9 style=| Big Ten Regular Season

|-
!colspan=9 style=| Big Ten Women's Tournament

Rankings

See also
2019–20 Rutgers Scarlet Knights men's basketball team

References 

Rutgers Scarlet Knights women's basketball seasons
Rutgers
Rutgers
Rutgers